Below is the list of populated places in Denizli Province, Turkey by the districts. In the following lists first place in each list is the administrative center of the district

Acıpayam 
Acıpayam
Neighbourhoods (including villages now called "neighbourhoods")

 Akalan
 Akşar
 Alaattin
 Alcı
 Aliveren
 Apa
 Aşağı
 Bademli
 Bedirbey
 Benlik
 Boğazdere
 Corum
 Çakır
 Çamlık
 Çiftlikköy
 Çubukçular
 Darıveren
 Dedebağı
 Dodurgalar
 Eskiköy
 Gedikli
 Gölcük
 Gümüş
 Güney
 Hacıkurtlar
 Hisar
 Karahüyük
 Karahüyükafşarı
 Karaismailler
 Kelekçi
 Kırca
 Köke
 Kumavşarı
 Kurtlar
 Kuyucak
 Kuzören
 Mevlütler
 Oğuzköy
 Olukbaşı
 Ovayurt
 Ören
 Pınarbaşı
 Pınaryazı
 Sandalcık
 Sırçalık
 Suçatı
 Ucarı
 Yassıhüyük
 Yazır
 Yeni
 Yeniköy
 Yeşildere
 Yeşilyuva
 Yolçatı
 Yukarı
 Yumrutaş

Babadağ 
Babadağ
Villages (now called "Neighbourhoods")

 Ahıllı
 Bekirler
 Cumhuriyet
 Demirli
 Gazi
 Gündoğdu
 İncirpınar
 Kelleci
 Kıranyer
 Mollaahmetler
 Oğuzlar
 Yeniköy

Baklan 
Baklan
Villages (now called "Neighbourhoods")

 Balca
 Beyelli
 Boğaziçi
 Çataloba
 Dağal
 Gökpınar
 Gürlük
 Hadim
 Hüsamettin Dede
 İcikli
 Kavaklar
 Kirazlı
 Konak
 Şenyayla

Bekilli 
Bekilli
Villages (now called "Neighbourhoods")

 Bahçeli
 Bükrüce
 Çamköy
 Çoğaşlı
 Deşdemir
 Ekizbaba
 Gömce
 Köselli
 Kutlubey
 Poyrazlı
 Sırıklı
 Üçkuyu
 Yahyalar
 Yeni
 Yeşiloba

Beyağaç 
Beyağaç
Villages (now called "Neighbourhoods")

 Cumhuriyet
 Çamlık
 Eşenler
 Fatih
 Geriçam
 Hürriyet
 Kapuz
 Kızılcaağaç
 Pınarönü
 Sazak
 Subaşı
 Uzunoluk
 Yeniçeşme
 Yenimahalle
 Zafer

Bozkurt 
Bozkurt
Villages (now called "Neighbourhoods")

 Alikurt
 Armutalanı
 Avdan
 Baklankuyucak
 Barbaros
 Başçeşme
 Cumalı
 Çambaşı
 Fatih
 Hamdiye
 Hayrettinköy
 İnceler
 İncelertekkesi
 Mahmudiye
 Mecidiye
 Mehmetçik
 Mimar Sinan
 Sazköy
 Tutluca
 Yenibağlar

Buldan 
Buldan
Villages (now called "Neighbourhoods")

 Aktaş
 Alacaoğlu
 Alandız
 Beyler
 Boğazçiftlik
 Bostanyeri
 Bozalan
 Bölmekaya
 Bursa
 Cumhuriyet
 Çamköy
 Çarşı
 Çatak
 Çaybaşı
 Derbent
 Dımbazlar
 Doğanköy
 Dört Eylül
 Düzalan
 Girne
 Gölbaşı
 Gülalan
 Güroluk
 Hasanbeyler
 Helvacılar
 Kadıköy
 Karaköy
 Karşıyaka
 Kaşıkcı
 Kırandamı
 Kovanoluk
 Kurtuluş
 Kurudere
 Mahmutlu
 Oğuzköy
 Sarımahmutlu
 Süleymanlı
 Turan
 Türlübey
 Yalçınkaya
 Yayla
 Yeni
 Yenicekent
 Yeniçam
 Yeşildere

Çal 
Çal
Villages (now called "Neighbourhoods")

 Akkent
 Alfaklar
 Aşağıseyit
 Bahadırlar
 Baklançakırlar
 Bayıralan
 Belevi
 Çalçakırlar
 Çalkuyucak
 Dağmarmara
 Dayılar
 Denizler
 Develler
 Gelinören
 Hançalar
 Hüseyinler
 İsabey
 İsmailler
 Kabalar
 Kaplanlar
 Karakaya
 Karapınar
 Kocaköy
 Mahmutgazi
 Ortaköy
 Peynirciler
 Sakızcılar
 Sazak
 Selcen
 Süller
 Şapçılar
 Yazır
 Yeşilyurt
 Yukarıseyit

Çameli 
Çameli
Villages (now called "Neighbourhoods")

 Akpınar
 Arıkaya
 Ayvacık
 Belevi
 Bıçakçı
 Cevizli
 Cumaalanı
 Çamlıbel
 Çiğdemli
 Elmalı
 Emecik
 Ericek
 Gökçeyaka
 Gürsu
 Güzelyurt
 İmamlar
 Kalınkoz
 Karabayır
 Kınıkyeri
 Kızılyaka
 Kirazlıyayla
 Kocaova
 Kolak
 Sarıkavak
 Sofular
 Taşçılar
 Yaylapınar
 Yeni
 Yeşilyayla
 Yumrutaş
 Yunuspınarı

Çardak 
Çardak
Villages (now called "Neighbourhoods")

 Ayvaz
 Bahçelievler
 Beylerli
 Cumhuriyet
 Çaltı
 Çınar
 Gemiş
 Gemişli
 Gemişpınarı
 Gölcük
 Hayriye
 Hürriyet
 İstiklal
 Saray
 Söğüt
 Söğütlü
 Söğütözü

Çivril 
Çivril
Villages (now called "Neighbourhoods")

 Akçaköy
 Akpınar
 Aktaş
 Aşağı
 Bayat
 Bekirli
 Belence
 Beydilli
 Beyköy
 Bozdağ
 Bucak
 Bulgurlar
 Caber
 Cumalar
 Çağlayan
 Çakallar
 Çandır
 Çapak
 Çarşı
 Çatlar
 Çayır
 Çetinler
 Çıtak
 Düzbel
 Emirhisar
 Gökgöl
 Gümüşsu
 Gürpınar
 Hamam
 Haydan
 Irgıllı
 Işıklı
 İğdir
 İmrallı
 İnceköy
 İshaklı
 Karabedirler
 Karahacılı
 Karalar
 Karamanlar
 Karayahşılar
 Kavakalanı
 Kavakköy
 Kıralan
 Kızılcasöğüt
 Kızılcayar
 Kocayaka
 Koçak
 Menteş
 Osmanköy
 Ömerli
 Özdemirci
 Reşadiye
 Sarıbeyli
 Saray
 Sarılar
 Savran
 Seraserli
 Somak
 Sökmen
 Stadyum
 Sundurlu
 Süngülü
 Şehitler
 Şenköy
 Tekkeköy
 Tokça
 Tuğlu
 Yahyalı
 Yakacık
 Yalınlı
 Yamanlar
 Yassıhüyük
 Yeşilyaka
 Yukarı
 Yukarıçapak
 Yuvaköy

Güney 
Güney
Villages (now called "Neighbourhoods")

 Adıgüzeller
 Aşağıçeşme
 Aydoğdu
 Cindere
 Çamrak
 Çorbacılar
 Doğanlı
 Ertuğrulköy
 Eziler
 Fatih
 Hamdiye
 Haylamaz
 Karaağaçlı
 Karagözler
 Kerimler
 Koparan
 Orta
 Ortaçeşme
 Parmaksızlar
 Tilkilik
 Üç Eylül
 Yağcılar
 Yeni
 Yenikonak

Honaz 
Honaz
Villages (now called "Neighbourhoods")

 Afşinbey
 Akbaş
 Aşağıdağdere
 Aydınlar
 Cumhuriyet
 Dereçiftlik
 Emirazizli
 Gürleyik
 Haydar
 Hisar
 Hürriyet
 Kaklık
 Karaçay
 Karateke
 Kızılyer
 Kocabaş
 Menteşe
 Ovacık
 Sapaca
 Yeni
 Yokuşbaşı
 Yukarıdağdere

Kale 
Kale
Villages (now called "Neighbourhoods")

 Adamharmanı
 Alanyurt
 Belenköy
 Cevherpaşa
 Cumhuriyet
 Çakırbağ
 Çamlarca
 Demirciler
 Doğanköy
 Esenkaya
 Gökçeören
 Gölbaşı
 Gülbağlık
 Habipler
 Hürriyet
 İnceğiz
 Karaköy
 Karayayla
 Kayabaşı
 Kırköy
 Koçarboğazı
 Köprübaşı
 Künar
 Muslugüme
 Narlı
 Ortaköy
 Ortatepe
 Özlüce
 Toki
 Uluçam
 Yenidere
 Yeniköy

Merkezefendi 
Merkezefendi
Villages (now called "Neighbourhoods")

 1200 Evler
 Adalet
 Akçeşme
 Akkonak
 Alpaslan
 Altındere
 Altıntop
 Aşağışamlı
 Bahçelievler
 Barbaros
 Barutçular
 Başkarcı
 Bereketler
 Bozburun
 Çakmak
 Çeltikçi
 Değirmenönü
 Eskihisar
 Gerzele
 Göveçlik
 Gültepe
 Gümüşçay
 Hacıeyüplü
 Hallaçlar
 Hisar
 İlbade
 Kadılar
 Karahasanlı
 Karaman
 Kayalar
 Kumkısık
 Mehmet Akif Ersoy
 Merkezefendi
 Muratdede
 Salihağa
 Saraylar
 Saruhan
 Selçuk Bey
 Servergazi
 Sevindik
 Sırakapılar
 Sümer
 Şemikler
 Şirinköy
 Üzerlik
 Yeni
 Yenişafak
 Yenişehir
 Yeşilyayla
 Zafer

Pamukkale 
Pamukkale
Villages (now called "Neighbourhoods")

 15 Mayıs
 Adnan Menderes
 Akçapınar
 Akdere
 Akhan
 Akköy
 Aktepe
 Anafartalar
 Asmalıevler
 Atalar
 Atatürk
 Aziziye
 Bağbaşı
 Belenardıç
 Cankurtaran
 Cumhuriyet
 Çamlaraltı
 Çerkez
 Çeşmebaşı
 Deliktaş
 Develi
 Dokuzkavaklar
 Eldenizli
 Eymir
 Fatih
 Fesleğen
 Goncalı
 Gökpınar
 Gölemezli
 Gözler
 Güzelköy
 Güzelpınar
 Hacıkaplanlar
 Haytabey
 Hürriyet
 Irlaganlı
 İncilipınar
 İstiklal
 Kale
 Karahayıt
 Karakova
 Karakurt
 Karataş
 Karşıyaka
 Kavakbaşı
 Kayıhan
 Kervansaray
 Kocadere
 Korucuk
 Kurtluca
 Kuşpınar
 Küçükdere
 Mahmut Sönmez
 Mehmetçik
 Oğuz
 Pamukkale
 Pelitlibağ
 Pınarkent
 Sami Türel
 Siteler
 Tekke
 Topraklık
 Uzunpınar
 Yeniköy
 Yukarışamlı
 Yunus Emre
 Zeytinköy
 Zümrüt

Sarayköy 
Sarayköy
Villages (now called "Neighbourhoods")

 Acıdere
 Acısu
 Adaköy
 Ahmetli
 Altıntepe
 Aşağı
 Atatürk
 Bala
 Beylerbeyi
 Caber
 Cumhuriyet
 Duacılı
 Gerali
 Hasköy
 Hisarköy
 Kabaağaç
 Karakıran
 Karataş
 Köprübaşı
 Kumluca
 Sakarya
 Sazak
 Sığma
 Tekkeköy
 Tepeköy
 Tırkaz
 Tosunlar
 Trafo
 Turan
 Uyanık
 Yakayurt
 Yeşilyurt

Serinhisar 
Serinhisar
Villages (now called "Neighbourhoods")

 Aşağı
 Ayaz
 Cumhuriyet
 Kaya
 Kocapınar
 Orta
 Pınarcık
 Şair Eşref
 Yatağan
 Yenice
 Yüreğil

Tavas 
Tavas
Neighbourhoods (including villages now called "neighbourhoods")

 Akıncılar
 Akyar
 Alpa
 Altınova
 Avdan
 Aydoğdu
 Baharlar
 Bahçeköy
 Balkıca
 Çağırgan
 Çalıköy
 Çiftlikköy
 Damlacık
 Denizoluğu
 Dereağzı
 Derinkuyu
 Ebecik
 Garipköy
 Gökçeler
 Gümüşdere
 Güzelköy
 Hırka
 Horasanlı
 Karahisar
 Kayaca
 Kayapınar
 Keçeliler
 Kızılca
 Kızılcabölük
 Kozlar
 Medet
 Nikfer
 Orta
 Ovacık
 Pınarlar
 Pınarlık
 Samanlık
 Sarıabat
 Seki
 Sofular
 Solmaz
 Tekkeköy
 Ulukent
 Vakıf
 Yahşiler
 Yaka
 Yeni
 Yeşilköy
 Yorga
 Yukarıboğaz

Recent development

According to Law act no 6360, all Turkish provinces with a population more than 750 000, were renamed as metropolitan municipality. Furthermore, the central district was renamed as Merkezefendi and Akköy was renamed as Pamukkale, with a small change in district border. All districts in those provinces became second level municipalities and all villages in those districts  were renamed as a neighborhoods . Thus the villages listed above are officially neighborhoods of Denizli.

References

List
Denizli